The Journal of African Law is published biannually by Cambridge University Press on behalf of the School of Oriental and African Studies (University of London, United Kingdom). It is a peer-reviewed law review covering the laws of sub-Saharan African countries, emphasizing contemporary legal issues and issues of international and comparative significance. The journal contains a separate section on recent legislation, case-law, law reform proposals, and recent international developments affecting Africa.

External links 
 

Law journals
Cambridge University Press academic journals
Biannual journals
Publications established in 1957
English-language journals
Academic journals associated with universities and colleges